Pengfei Guan, is a Canadian mathematician and Canada Research Chair in Geometric Analysis. He is a professor of mathematics at McGill University and a Fellow of the Royal Society of Canada.

Biography

Guan graduated from the Department of Mathematics of Zhejiang University in Hangzhou. From 1982 to 1984, Guan was a graduate student at the Institute of Mathematics of the Chinese Academy of Sciences in Beijing. From 1984 to 1985, Guan studied at the University of North Carolina at Chapel Hill. Guan later continued his studies at Princeton University. Guan obtained his MS in 1986 and his PhD in 1989, both in mathematics from Princeton University.

Guan was an assistant professor (from 1989 to 1993), associate professor (from 1993 to 1997), and professor (from 1997 to 2004), all at the Department of Mathematics at McMaster University. Since 2004, Guan has been a professor of mathematics at McGill University.

Guan was awarded the Alfred P. Sloan Fellowship from 1993 to 1995. Guan has held the Canada Research Chair since 2004. Guan was elected to the Fellow of Royal Society of Canada in 2008.

References

External links
 The Mathematics Genealogy Project - Pengfei Guan
 管鹏飞当选为加拿大皇家科学院院士 
 Academic Personnel at McGill University - Pengfei Guan
 Home Page of Pengfei Guan at McGill University

Living people
Zhejiang University alumni
Princeton University alumni
Academic staff of McMaster University
Academic staff of McGill University
20th-century Chinese mathematicians
21st-century Canadian  mathematicians
Fellows of the Royal Society of Canada
Canada Research Chairs
Canadian people of Chinese descent
Year of birth missing (living people)